Franz Wöss Racing is an Austrian motor racing team. It was founded in the early 1990s by Franz Wöss. Currently Franz Wöss Racing competes in the Remus F3 Cup. The team did also participate in the now folded German Formula 3 Championship occasionally.

Franz Wöss Racing didn't aim to compete for championships in German Formula 3, but rather entered and prepared any car from well-funded or so-called 'gentleman drivers'. From 2006 to 2013, with the exceptions of Hamad Al Fardan and their 2011 entries, they competed only in the Trophy Class which was restricted to older Formula 3 cars.

The team won their first drivers' championship in the 1997 Austria Formula 3 Cup season with Czech driver Petr Krizan. However, the team has won the 1994 Austria Formula 3 Trophy before.

Team founder and owner Franz Wöss is also the organizer of the Remus F3 Cup and the FIA CEZ Formula 3.

History

Single-seaters

Current series results

Austria Formula 3 Cup/Remus F3 Cup

† – Shared results with other teams

Former series results

German Formula 3

† – Shared results with other teams ‡ – Guest driver – ineligible for points.

References

German Formula 3 teams
Auto racing teams established in 1990
Austrian auto racing teams